Karl Albert Staaff (21 January 1860 – 4 October 1915) was a Swedish liberal politician and lawyer. He was chairman of the Liberal Coalition Party (1907–1915) and served twice as Prime Minister of Sweden (1905–1906 and 1911–1914).

Staaff was active in the Swedish movement for universal suffrage, and as the Liberal party's Prime Minister he presided in 1905 over an attempt to introduce universal and equal suffrage for men. His successor as party leader, Nils Edén, eventually managed to carry this further into universal suffrage in 1918–19, including for women. Due to conservative intervention, Staaff's proposal for first past the post was ultimately scrapped for a proportional system. In 1912, the period of leave that women were allowed following a child's birth was extended to 6 weeks, and in 1913 a tax-financed pension scheme was introduced.

Staaff ran into sharp conflict with the conservative Swedish establishment, and became a hated figure in the Conservative, pro-Monarchic and anti-Democratic establishment. An intense smear campaign was launched against him, picturing him as the destroyer of Swedish tradition and society: wealthy Stockholmers could even buy ash-trays shaped as his head. His staunch anti-military politics created the greatest fundraising in the Swedish history until that time, the 12 M kronor coastal battleship  where the funds where raised in a few months in 1912. Staaff had to bite the lemon, and the ship was ordered.

In 1914 Staaff stepped down from government in protest, after Conservatives had summoned a farmers' demonstration at the Royal castle's court in Stockholm, where King Gustaf V – who according to the law was supposed to stay out of politics – denounced Staaff's defence policies.

The contemporary Swedish Liberal party The Liberals counts him as the first among the more prominent leaders of Swedish 20th century liberalism, followed by such parliamentarians as Nils Edén, Carl Ekman, Nobel Prize laureate Bertil Ohlin, Gunnar Helén, Per Ahlmark and Bengt Westerberg.

References

External links 
 

1860 births
1915 deaths
People from Stockholm
Liberal Party of Sweden politicians
People from Uppland
Members of the Riksdag
Prime Ministers of Sweden
Swedish Ministers for Justice
Uppsala University alumni
Free-minded National Association politicians